John Coker may refer to:
John Coker (soldier) (1789–1851), soldier in the Texas Army during the Texas Revolution
John Coker (clergyman) (died 1631/35), Anglican clergyman and misidentified author
John Coker (basketball) (born 1971), American basketball player
John Coker (boxer) (born 1940), Sierra Leonean boxer
John Coker (cricketer) (1821–1901), English cricketer and clergyman